The wild card was established for Major League Baseball's playoffs in  with the intention of helping the best teams that did not win their division to still have a chance to win the World Series. The restructuring of both the American League and National League from two to three divisions each made it necessary to either give one team a bye in the first round of playoffs, or create the wild card for the best second-place team. In addition, the wild card guaranteed that the team with the second-best record in each league would qualify for the playoffs, even if they were in the same division with the team having the best record. As the 1994 postseason was canceled due to the 1994–95 Major League Baseball strike,  was the first postseason with a wild card team.

Beginning in 2012, a second wild card team was added to each league. The two wild card teams in each league face each other in a one-game playoff, the Wild Card Game, with the winner advancing to meet the number one seed in the Division Series.

For the 2020 postseason only, the field expanded to include three second-place teams per division, followed by the wild card teams represented by the next two best records from each league. All eight teams played in a best-of-three Wild Card Series.

Starting in 2022, a third wild card team was added to each league. The lowest-seeded wild card team (#6 seed) would then face the lowest-seeded division winner (#3 seed) in the best-of-three Wild Card round, with the remaining two Wild Card teams (#4 and #5 seed) squaring off in the other bracket. The Division Series will then have the top-seed play the fourth-fifth winner, while the runner-up plays the third-sixth winner. The brackets remain fixed, with no re-seeding.

NL Wild Card qualifiers by year

Through the 2022 postseason, every National League team has qualified as a wild card at least once, with the Philadelphia Phillies and San Diego Padres the last teams to do so. (However, the Padres did win the postseason wild card round in 2020, under MLB's modified playoff format that year, though not having the best record in the NL West.) The Colorado Rockies have been a wild card qualifier an NL record five times, followed by the New York Mets and St. Louis Cardinals with four each.

Through the 2020 postseason, five NL wild card teams have gone on to win the World Series (Florida in 1997 and 2003, St. Louis in 2011, San Francisco in 2014 and Washington in 2019). Four teams won the NL pennant but lost the World Series (New York in 2000, San Francisco in 2002, Houston in 2005, and Colorado in 2007). Four other teams won a division series but lost the championship series, most recently Chicago in 2015.

Most NL Wild Card appearances

Notes:
 The Houston Astros have competed in the American League since 2013.
 The Miami Marlins were known as the Florida Marlins before 2012.

See also

National League Division Series
List of American League Wild Card winners
Major League Baseball division winners
Wild card (sports)#Major League Baseball
Wild card (sports)#Record disparities

References

National
Wild Card